Andrzej Rapacz (1 September 1948 – 7 February 2022) was a Polish biathlete. He competed at the 1972 Winter Olympics and the 1976 Winter Olympics. Rapacz died on 7 February 2022, at the age of 73.

References

External links
 

1948 births
2022 deaths
Polish male biathletes
Olympic biathletes of Poland
Biathletes at the 1972 Winter Olympics
Biathletes at the 1976 Winter Olympics
Sportspeople from Zakopane